Prag Cine Awards are presented annually by Prag News & Rengoni, a satellite television channel from Assam. The aim of the award to give support, recognition and inspiration to the Assamese film industry and honour some of the eminent film personalities who have contributed to the cause of Assamese cinema of Assam. The award was first instituted in the year 2003. Starting from 2015, films produced in other Northeastern states were also honored in this ceremony.

Ceremonies 

|-
|Prag Cine Awards 2022
|26 March 2022 | Silchar

Awards

Awards for films from Assam

Awards for films from rest of northeast India

See also
 Cinema of Assam
 National Film Award for Best Feature Film in Assamese

References

External links
  Actors play phoenix at awards function - Gogoi appeals for donation at Prag ceremony to rebuild B. Borooah, The Telegraph, Published on March 7, 2005 (Monday). 
 Bollywood stars to grace Prag Cine Award, Assam Times, Published on 5 April 2013.
 Prag Cine Award 2014 and its Nominations, Assam Online Portal, Published on 3 March 2014
 Nominations of Prag Cine Award 2014, www.creativica.in, Published on 1 March 2014
 Prag Cine Awards North-East 2018 Held in Guwahati, KothAsobi.com, Published on June 14, 2018

Indian film awards
Awards established in 2003
Indian awards
Cinema of Assam
2003 establishments in Assam
Assam awards